Wednesday's Child is a 1934 American drama film directed by John S. Robertson and written by Willis Goldbeck, based on the 1934 play Wednesday's Child by Leopold L. Atlas. The film stars Karen Morley, Edward Arnold, Frankie Thomas, Robert Shayne and Frank Conroy. The film was released on October 26, 1934, by RKO Pictures. The play was later adapted to film again as the 1946 RKO film Child of Divorce.

Plot
Ten-year-old Bobby (Frankie Thomas) and a group of friends see Bobby's mother (Karen Morley)  kissing a man who is not her husband. Despite serious concerns about Bobby, a divorce ensues and Bobby, although thoroughly disenchanted with his mother, is sent away with her where month after month despite all her efforts he grows more depressed, dreaming of reunification with his beloved father (Edward Arnold). On returning to his father at vacation, he finds him preoccupied with an impending second marriage. Bobby suffers a serious breakdown but is nevertheless packed off to military school. Later, visiting the school, his parents overhear Bobby and his roommate, also a child of divorce, discussing how they are on their own now. With the mother's blessing, the father decides to cancel his upcoming marriage and take Bobby back home where the two of them can live together happily.

Cast 
Karen Morley as Kathryn Phillips
Edward Arnold as Ray Phillips
Frankie Thomas as Bobby Phillips
Robert Shayne as Howard Benson
Frank Conroy as The Judge
Shirley Grey as Louise
Paul Stanton as Keyes
David Durand as Charles
Richard Barbee as Dr. Stirling
Frank M. Thomas as Attorney for the Defense 
Mona Bruns as The Nurse
Elsa Janssen as Martha

References

External links 
 

1934 films
American black-and-white films
RKO Pictures films
Films directed by John S. Robertson
1934 drama films
American drama films
1930s English-language films
1930s American films
English-language drama films